The 2018–19 America East Conference men's basketball season will begin with practices in October 2018, followed by the start of the 2018–19 NCAA Division I men's basketball season in November. Regular season conference play began in December 2018 and concluded in March 2019. The 2019 America East Conference tournament will be held from March 9-16, 2019. The Vermont Catamounts won their 3rd consecutive outright regular season championship, under the guidance of John Becker, who also received his third consecutive America East Coach of the Year Award, and fourth in total.

Head coaches

Coaching changes 
Bob Walsh did not have his contract extended as head coach of Maine and was replaced by Richard Barron.

Coaches 

Notes:
 Year at school includes 2018–19 season.
 Overall and America East records are from time at current school and are through the end the 2018–19 season.
 NCAA Tournament appearances are from time at current school only.

Preseason

Preseason poll 
Source

() first place votes

Preseason All-Conference Teams 
Source

America East Preseason Player of the Year: Anthony Lamb (Vermont)

Regular season

Conference matrix
This table summarizes the head-to-head results between teams in conference play. Each team will play 16 conference games, and at least 1 against each opponent.

Player of the week
Throughout the conference regular season, the America East Conference offices named one or two Players of the week and one or two Rookies of the week.

Statistics leaders
Source

Final standings
Source

Postseason

America East tournament

NCAA Tournament

National Invitation Tournament

Awards

All-Americans

To earn "consensus" status, a player must win honors based on a point system computed from the four different all-America teams. The point system consists of three points for first team, two points for second team and one point for third team. No honorable mention or fourth team or lower are used in the computation. The top five totals plus ties are first team and the next five plus ties are second team.

America East Awards
Source

Attendance

See also
 2018–19 NCAA Division I men's basketball season
America East Conference

References